Saratoga Central Catholic High School is a private, Roman Catholic high school and middle school located in Saratoga Springs, New York.  It is located within the Roman Catholic Diocese of Albany. The 2021-2022 enrollment is 202 students. Tuition for the 2021–2022 school year is $7,380 (6-8) and $9,830 (9-12).

Background
Saratoga Central Catholic was established in 1862. It was established as Saint Peter's Academy and later changed to its current name in 1976. It is the only Catholic high school in Saratoga County. Grades 7 and 8 were added in 1989 and Grade 6 was added in 2006. While Saratoga Central Catholic is situated next to and was formerly named after the Church of St. Peter, it is officially affiliated with St. Clement's Parish in downtown Saratoga Springs.

Athletics
Saratoga Central Catholic offers a total of 9 sports including, Cross Country, Golf, Volleyball, Soccer, Basketball, Bowling, Baseball, Track and Field, Softball. All play on the varsity level, with Track and Field, Cross Country, Golf and Bowling being Co-Ed.

Notes and references

External links
 School Website

Catholic secondary schools in New York (state)
Buildings and structures in Saratoga Springs, New York
Educational institutions established in 1862
Roman Catholic Diocese of Albany
Schools in Saratoga County, New York
Private middle schools in New York (state)
1862 establishments in New York (state)